Uroplakin 3B is a protein that in humans is encoded by the UPK3B gene.

Function

UPK3B is a minor component of the apical plaques of mammalian urothelium that binds and dimerizes with uroplakin-1b (UPK1B; MIM 602380), one of the major conserved urothelium membrane proteins. 

The other major conserved integral membrane proteins of urothelial plaques are UPK1A (MIM 611557), UPK2 (MIM 611558), and UPK3A (MIM 611559) (Deng et al., 2002 [PubMed 12446744]).[supplied by OMIM, Mar 2008].

References

Further reading